Giora Yaron (born 1948) is a Doctor of Physics, businessman, and chairman of the board of directors of the Tel Aviv University.

Early years 
Yaron was born in Kibbutz Manara to Dan and Giza Yaron. 
In the IDF, Yaron served in the 12th Battalion (Barak) of the Golani Brigade, and completed an officers' course. He holds a BA (Graduated summa cum laude) in Physics and Mathematics and a PhD in applied physics from the Hebrew University. 
In 1979 Yaron worked as a physicist at the National Semiconductor Company in Santa Clara, Silicon Valley. In 1982, he returned with his family to Israel  directed National Semiconductor's research and development center in Herzliya Pituah (NSTA) later, he founded the National Semiconductor in Migdal Haemek (NSMH), this center became Tower Jazz.
In 1992, he managed the Indigo digital printing company (founded by Benny Landa) in Ness Ziona, and in 1994 led it to an IPO on NASDAQ.

Establishment of companies 
 Itamar Medical – 1997-2022, founder and chairman.  
 P-Cube – 1999-2004, co-founder and chairman. 
 Qwilt – 2010-Today, co-founder and board member. 
 Hyperwise- Founding Investor and board member. 
 Siraj Technologies – 2017-Today, co-founder and chairman.

Business exits 
Yaron was involved in a few exits. such as: 
 Comsys - Part of Comsys was sold to Conexant (1996). The other part was sold to Texas Instruments (2005). 
 P-Cube - sold to Cisco(2004).
 Qumranet - sold to Red Hat (2008)
 Hyperwise - sold to Check Point (2015)

Past and present senior positions 
 Chairman of the Board of Directors of the Tel Aviv University (2010-2018)
 Chairman of the Board of Directors of Itamar Medical (since 1997)
 Member of the Board of Directors of Amdocs (since 2009)
 Member of the Advisory Committee to the Minister of Defense on technological aspects of commemoration
 Member of the Board of Directors of Qwilt, Excelero, Equalum.

Personal life 
Yaron lives in Caesarea with his wife, Zila.

References

External links 
 Giora Yaron PhD
 Researchgate profile
 גיורא ירון, ממייסדי ההייטק הישראלי, יוצא לחבר את הבדואים לתעשייה

1948 births
Living people
Israeli company founders
Hebrew University of Jerusalem alumni
Tel Aviv University people